This is the complete filmography of actress Ruth Hussey (October 30, 1911 – April 19, 2005). Originally a native of Providence, Rhode Island, Hussey began her career in summer stock and modeling before entering films in the late 1930s through Metro-Goldwyn-Mayer Studios. In a career that lasted over 40 years, and totaled 69 credits all together, she made a name for herself as a notable actress earning an Academy Award nomination for Best Supporting Actress along the way for her portrayal of the cynical magazine photographer Elizabeth Imbrie in The Philadelphia Story.

Film and television appearances

References

Actress filmographies
American filmographies